The 1st Minnesota Light Artillery Battery   was a Minnesota USV artillery battery that served in the Union Army during the American Civil War. The battery was mustered in at Fort Snelling, Minnesota. on  November 21, 1861.

The 1st Minnesota Light Artillery Battery was mustered out at St. Paul, Minnesota, on July 1, 1865.

Commanders
 Captain Emil Munch - November 7, 1861, to December 25, 1862
 Captain William Z. Clayton - December 25, 1862, to July 1, 1865.

Casualties and total strength
The 1st Minnesota Light Artillery Battery lost 1 officer and 7 enlisted men killed in action or died of wounds received in battle and 1 officer and 29 enlisted men died of disease. Total fatalities were 38.

Battles and Campaigns
The 1st Minnesota Light Artillery Battery took part in the Battle of Shiloh, Siege of Vicksburg, the Atlanta Campaign and Sherman's March to the Sea. They served in the 4th Division of the 17th U.S. Army Corps. On 5 March 1864, Captain Clayton exchanged the old guns, two 12-pound howitzers, and two 6-pound rifled guns, caliber 3.67, for four new rifled 3-inch Rodman's guns. The 3-inch Rodman guns were actually 3-inch ordnance rifles.

References

External links
The Civil War Archive Website
Civil War letters of Thomas and William Christie who were part of the 1st MN Light Artillery
1st Minnesota Light Artillery in the Atlanta Campaign May-Sept. 1864
1st Minnesota Light Artillery at Shiloh and Corinth
 Minnesota Historical Society page on Minnesota and the Civil War

See also
List of Minnesota Civil War Units

Units and formations of the Union Army from Minnesota
Artillery units and formations of the American Civil War
1861 establishments in Minnesota
Military units and formations established in 1861
Military units and formations disestablished in 1865